The discography of Fountains of Wayne contains five studio albums, one compilation album, 16 singles, one DVD, six music videos and seven other appearances.

Fountains of Wayne were formed in 1995 by bassist Adam Schlesinger and guitarist Chris Collingwood. They were joined by Jody Porter and Brian Young and recorded a demo.

The demo fell into the hands of Atlantic Records and in 1996, the band released their debut self-titled album. Two singles were released from it but it was the song "That Thing You Do", written by Schlesinger, that gained popularity through its use as the title song for the Tom Hanks' film of the same name. The track gained Schlesinger an Oscar nomination and the soundtrack gained RIAA gold certification.

The release of their second album, Utopia Parkway, in 1999 gained them mixed reviews and produced three singles. However, frustrations between the band and the label resulted in them being dropped by Atlantic Records. The band went into a hiatus, with all the members pursuing alternative musical paths. It wasn't until 2001 that the band resurfaced with a cover of The Kinks' "Better Things". 

Welcome Interstate Managers, the third album, was released in 2003 on S-Curve Records. The single "Stacy's Mom" became an instant success earning a gold certification by the RIAA. The two follow-up singles, "Mexican Wine" and "Hey Julie" were not as popular; however, the track "All Kinds of Time" received commercial airtime through NFL promotions throughout the 2005 season. The success, particularly of "Stacy's Mom", led to the band being nominated for two Grammys; Best New Artist and Best Pop Performance by a Duo or Group with Vocals for "Stacy's Mom".

A compilation of B-sides was released in June 2005 entitled Out-of-State Plates. Two years later, in April 2007, a new album was released called Traffic and Weather. The track "I-95" from the album was named in Rolling Stones Top 50 Songs of 2007.

The band's first DVD, No Better Place: Live in Chicago was released March 3, 2009. In 2011, the band released its final album, Sky Full of Holes, under Yep Roc Records.

Albums

Studio albums

Compilation albums

Singles

Other charted songs

Notes

Video albums

Music videos

Other appearances

References

External links
Fountains of Wayne official website
Fountains of Wayne at Musicbrainz
Fountains of Wayne at Discogs

Discographies of American artists
Rock music group discographies